The second-seeds Jean Borotra and Jacques Brugnon defeated the unseeded Gar Moon and Jim Willard 6–2, 4–6, 6–4, 6–4 in the final, to win the men's doubles tennis title at the 1928 Australian Championships.

Seeds

  Jack Hawkes /  Gerald Patterson (semifinals)
  Jean Borotra /  Jacques Brugnon (champions)
  Jack Crawford /  Harry Hopman (quarterfinals)
  Christian Boussus /  Fred Kalms (second round)

Draw

Finals

Earlier rounds

Section 1

Section 2

References

External links
Source for seedings
Source for the draw

1928 in Australian tennis
Men's Doubles